Lucia Gueth Mida (August 4, 1887 – April 1952), also known as Mrs. Lee Mida and Louise Mida, was a golfer from Chicago, Illinois. She won the 1930 Women's Western Open, which was later designated by the LPGA as the first women's major. Mida was an experienced competitor at that time.

Biography
Mida was born Hedwig Louise E. Gueth in Chicago, Illinois, to German immigrants August Gueth and Clara Friederich. Lee was her husband's name; wives and widows often used their husband's name with a "Mrs." added on back in her era. Her husband would become the Chicago City Champion in 1909; leading the way to her own golfing career.

In addition to the 1930 Women's Western Open, Mida also won the Women's Western Amateur in 1923 and the Florida Women's State Golf Association State Amateur Match Play Championship in 1929 and 1930 (defeating Mrs. John L. Holmes). Her unwillingness to become a permanent resident of Florida forced Mida not to defend her title in 1931 as the competition become "closed" except to Florida residents.

Mida was one of the team members that in 1930 traveled to Europe to play an international match against Great Britain. That trip was the prelude to the Curtis Cup matches.

Major championships

Wins (1)

References

External links
 Photographs of Mrs. Lee W. Mida at the Library of Congress

American female golfers
Winners of LPGA major golf championships
Golfers from Chicago
1887 births
1952 deaths